Abacetus salamensis is a species of ground beetle in the subfamily Pterostichinae. It was described by Kolbe in 1898.

References

salamensis
Beetles described in 1898